The Dutch Museum Association (Dutch: De Museumvereniging) is an association of museums in the Netherlands. Over five hundred museums are affiliated with the association.

History
In 1926, the Museumvereniging was established as a meeting of museum directors in the Netherlands. In 2003, the Museumkaart foundation was integrated into the Dutch Museum Association organisation. In 2006, the Museumvereniging became an umbrella organisation for the Dutch museums organised into ten subject-specific areas. The Association of National Museums, for example, is included within the Museumvereniging umbrella. Irene Asscher-Vonk is the first president of the Museumvereniging.

Activities
De Museumvereniging focuses on advocacy and professional development of its members and promotes museum visits. It facilitates the Stichting Museumregister Nederland (English: the Dutch Museum Register), which facilitates recognition of the status of these museums. The Dutch Museum Association also facilitates the Ethical Code Commission for Museums. 
Additionally, the Dutch Museum Association is responsible for the Foundation of the Museumkaart. Approximately 400 of the 500 Dutch Museum Association members are participants in the Museumkaart Foundation, meaning that they accept the Museumkaart.  The Dutch Museum Association also organises the Dutch Museumweekend.

Members
Amsterdam

Many of the museums in Amsterdam are members of the Dutch Museum Association as well as the Official Museums of Amsterdam. Additionally, many of these museums are involved in the Museumkaart initiative of the Dutch Museum Association.

 Allard Pierson Museum
 Amsterdam Museum
 Pijpenkabinet & Smokiana
 Anne Frank House
 Bijbels Museum
 Special collections
 De Appel Arts Centre
 National Holocaust Memorial
 Nieuwe Kerk
 Oude Kerk
 Diamond Museum Amsterdam
 EYE Film Institute Netherlands
 Foam
 Hermitage Amsterdam
 The Dutch Maritime Museum
 Huis Marseille
 Joods Historisch Museum
 Royal Palace of Amsterdam
 Max Euwe Centrum
 Museum Geelvinck-Hinlopen
 Rembrandthuis
 Museum Het Schip
 Dutch Funeral Museum
 Museum Van Loon
 Ons' Lieve Heer op Solder
 Persmuseum
 Portugees-Israëlietische Synagoge
 Reinwardt Academie
 Rijksmuseum
 Stichting Academisch Erfgoed
 NEMO
 Stadsarchief Amsterdam
 Stedelijk Museum
 Museum of Bags and Purses
 Tropenmuseum
 Tropenmuseum Junior
 Van Gogh Museum
 Verzetsmuseum
 Museum Willet-Holthuysen

References

External links
Dutch Museum Association, official website

Association of state monuments: http://www.derijksmusea.nl/

Museums in the Netherlands
Museum organizations